Carlo Camilli (born 2 October 1984) is an Italian footballer who plays for Ternana as a goalkeeper.

Career
Born in Umbertide, the Province of Perugia, Camilli played for Perugia in 2004–05 Serie B. He wore no.31 shirt as fourth keeper, behind Željko Kalac, Lorenzo Squizzi and Davide Faraon. After Perugia expelled from professional league in 2005, he left for Swiss side Young Fellows Juventus and returned to Sansovino the following summer. In summer 2008 he was signed by Colligiana and in August signed by Serie B team Ascoli. On 19 August 2010 he was signed by Serie B newcomer Pescara and awarded no.13 shirt. He was the understudy of Salvatore Pinna, Gabriele Bartoletti along with youngster Francesco Cattenari. In August 2011 he left for Ternana Calcio, as the backup of Stefano Ambrosi along with Fabio Virgili.

His father died when Camilli was age 26, leaving him to run the family's metalworking business. Camilli initially played football while he was managing the business, but ultimately had to retire from playing due to his business responsibilities.

References

External links
 Football.it Profile 

1984 births
Living people
People from Umbertide
Italian footballers
S.S. Teramo Calcio players
A.C. Perugia Calcio players
SC Young Fellows Juventus players
A.C. Sansovino players
A.S.D. Olimpia Colligiana players
Ascoli Calcio 1898 F.C. players
Delfino Pescara 1936 players
Ternana Calcio players
Association football goalkeepers
Italian expatriate footballers
Italian expatriate sportspeople in Switzerland
Expatriate footballers in Switzerland
Footballers from Umbria
Sportspeople from the Province of Perugia